Martell Bridge Halt railway station served the village of Little Newcastle, Pembrokeshire, Wales, from 1930 to 1937 on the North Pembrokeshire and Fishguard Railway.

History 
The station opened on 1 January 1930 by the Great Western Railway. It was situated on the east side of a minor road on the C3009. The local area was known as Mattel but GWR misspelled it as 'Martell'. This spelling error was not corrected in Bradshaw or on the tickets. There were only 70-80 tickets sold per week, thus it closed on 25 October 1937.

References

External links 

Disused railway stations in Pembrokeshire
Former Great Western Railway stations
Railway stations in Great Britain opened in 1930
Railway stations in Great Britain closed in 1937
1930 establishments in Wales
1937 disestablishments in Wales
Puncheston